Faith Patricia Evans (May 11, 1937 – January 9, 2014) was a Hawaii state legislator and one of the first women to serve as a United States Marshal.

Early years

Evans, of Hawaiian and Puerto Rican descent, was  born in Honolulu, Hawaii. She previously worked as public relations director of Habilitat Inc., and was a member of the Hawaii Legislature for six years (1974-1980).

U.S. Marshal
Evans was appointed U.S. Marshal for the District of Hawaii by President Ronald Reagan on August 12, 1982. She was involved in various high-profile cases while serving as U.S. Marshal. One of them was the 1964 case of Henry Huihui, a leading figure in Hawaii's underworld, who became a protected Federal witness in a plea bargain that required him to testify, on request, about crimes he knew about. According to Evans: Another high-profile case was that involving Franklin Y.K. Sunn. Hawaii's top welfare officer who was jailed on a contempt-of-court charge in 1983. Before the judge set Sunn free, Evans said:

Other activities

Evans was also a registered nurse who worked at St. Francis Hospital. She founded the Puerto Rican Heritage Society in Hawaii and, in 2000, led the Puerto Rican Centennial Commission of Hawaii. During the celebration activities of the Puerto Rican Centennial Commission, Evans was quoted as saying:

Death
Evans died on January 9, 2014, in Kailua, Hawaii. She is survived by husband, Noel; son, John; daughters, Tricia and Kathleen; sister, June (Harry) Shultz, Leona Parker; brother, Donald Ernesto.

Hawaii Gov. Neil Abercrombie paid tribute to Evans and ordered that the flags of the United States and State of Hawaii be flown at half-staff at all state offices and agencies as well as the Hawaii National Guard from sunrise to sunset on Friday, Jan. 17, 2014, the day of her memorial services.

See also

List of Puerto Ricans
Irish immigration to Puerto Rico
Puerto Rican migration to Hawaii

References

1937 births
2014 deaths
United States Marshals
Women state legislators in Hawaii
Members of the Hawaii House of Representatives
Puerto Rican law enforcement personnel
American women nurses
Politicians from Honolulu
Native Hawaiian people
Hawaii people of Puerto Rican descent